Jürgen Gauß (Juergen Gauss) is a German theoretical chemist.

Gauß was born on 13 August 1960 in Konstanz. He studied chemistry at the University of Cologne from 1979 till 1984. After finishing his PhD thesis on abinitio calculations at the University of Cologne in 1988, he did postdoctoral studies at the University of Washington in Seattle and at the University of Florida in Gainesville about quantum theory. He did his habilitation in 1994 at the University of Karlsruhe on abinitio calculations of NMR-shifts. In 1995, he became professor at the University of Mainz.

In 2005, he received the Gottfried Wilhelm Leibniz Prize of the Deutsche Forschungsgemeinschaft, which is the highest honour awarded in German research.

References
 Portrait at the Deutschen Forschungsgesellschaft

1960 births
Living people
University of Cologne alumni
University of Washington alumni
University of Florida alumni
Karlsruhe Institute of Technology alumni
Academic staff of Johannes Gutenberg University Mainz
21st-century German chemists
Gottfried Wilhelm Leibniz Prize winners
People from Konstanz
Computational chemists
20th-century German chemists